Archbishop Rummel High School is a Catholic, Lasallian secondary school for boys located in Metairie, a community in unincorporated Jefferson Parish, Louisiana.  The school is named after Archbishop Joseph Rummel, a former Archbishop in the Archdiocese of New Orleans.

History
Opened on September 10, 1962, Archbishop Rummel High School was one of four  archdiocesan Catholic high schools established for students of Jefferson Parish, a New Orleans suburb, as a result of an archdiocesan campaign. On that first day of class, 225 freshmen formed the charter class of the school. In its second year, with the admission of nine freshman classes, the school had an enrolment of almost 600 students. Additional freshman classes were added each year until the 1965–66 school year when the school was a complete high school with 1,100 students. The charter class of 222 was graduated on May 27, 1966. The school operated as a four year high school until 1981 when the Archdiocese of New Orleans gave permission for the school to begin an eighth grade program for the 1982–83 academic year.

The senior high school plant occupies one third of the campus and consists of five separate building adjoined by covered walkways. The remaining portion of the campus is structure-free for athletic programs and future development. The senior high campus is divided into the faculty office wing, the administration-library wing, and the classroom wings completing a quadrangle in the center of which is the school chapel. A senior wing was added in 1966 to accommodate the first senior class. Additionally, in 1985 the school purchased the former Stuart Prep property adjacent to the school to use for a junior high campus.

The school cafeteria and gymnasium are located on the senior high campus. In memory of the Nelson-Smyth family of Chicago, the gymnasium was dedicated in May 1963. A building program that saw the construction of the senior wing also included the music building, an athletic field house, and an addition to the faculty office wing. During the 1980–81 school year, the school enclosed the area under the senior wing to make a student mall and also added a weight room to the field house.

The Brothers of the Christian Schools (Christian Brothers) conducted Archbishop Rummel High School through June 1993, when they relinquished governance to the Archdiocese of New Orleans. On September 16, 2009 Archbishop Rummel High School officially re-associated itself with the Brothers of the Christian Schools.  Two Christian Brothers currently remain on staff for the school year. They and lay men and women comprise the administration, faculty, and staff of the school.

Academics 
The Program of Studies at Archbishop Rummel High School complies with or exceeds the requirements of the Louisiana State Board of Education, the Louisiana Tuition Opportunity Program for Students (TOPS), the Southern Association of Colleges and Schools (SACS), and the general entrance requirements of universities and colleges. The Louisiana State Board of Education, the Office of Catholic Schools of the Archdiocese of New Orleans, and the Archbishop Rummel Curriculum Committee, have approved these requirements.

The primary purpose of a Catholic high school like Archbishop Rummel is the faith development of its students. With this as its goal, the gospel values and teaching of faith are integrated throughout the school curricula and programs.

Pre-professional programs 
Through the engineering, biomedical sciences, and law pre-professional programs at Archbishop Rummel High School, students learn both in the classroom and inside real world environments such as medical centers, engineering offices, and courtrooms. Through community partnerships, students learn from some of the metro area's top professionals in these industries.

Dual enrollment 
In cooperation with Southeastern Louisiana University, Archbishop Rummel High School
students complete college-level courses. These courses are taught by Archbishop Rummel
High School teachers on the Archbishop Rummel High School campus, in partnership with
Southeastern Louisiana University professors.

The students earn both high school and college credit that goes on the Archbishop Rummel
High School transcript and on a Southeastern Louisiana University transcript. The credit
is transferable to all public universities and colleges in the state of Louisiana and to many
other colleges - including private universities in Louisiana and colleges outside the state.
The college credit counts towards the student's eventual college grade point average.

Student organizations
Academic:
Chess Club
Junior High Math Club
Latin Club
Mu Alpha Theta
National Honor Society / National Junior Honor Society
Raider Robotics Team
Fine Arts:
Art Club
Band
Raider Chorus
Genesian Players
Guitar Club
Literary:
The Raider Yearbook
Raiders' Digest Newspaper
Service:
Raider Ambassadors
Big Brothers
Campus Ministry
Key Club
Student Council
Other:
Fishing Club
Fooseball Club
Ping Pong Club
Video Game Club

Athletics
Archbishop Rummel competes in the LHSAA. 

Sports offered by the school are baseball, basketball, bowling, cheerleading, cross country, football, golf, powerlifting, soccer, swimming, tennis, track and field, ultimate frisbee, and wrestling.

Championships
Football championships
(3) State Championships: 2012, 2013, 2019

Notable alumni
 Jim Bullinger – Former professional baseball player (Chicago Cubs, Montreal Expos, Seattle Mariners)
 Kirk Bullinger – Former professional baseball player (Montreal Expos, Boston Red Sox, Philadelphia Phillies, Houston Astros); head baseball coach at Archbishop Shaw High School in Marrero, Louisiana
 Cethan Carter '13 – American football player
 Ja'Marr Chase '18 - 5th overall pick in 2021 NFL Draft, wide receiver for the Cincinnati Bengals, 2019 Fred Biletnikoff Award winner
 O'Neil De Noux '68 – Author
 Thomas Diamond – Former professional baseball player (Chicago Cubs) #10 player selected in the MLB draft
 Steven Dunbar – CFL football player
Kristian Fulton '16 – 2nd round pick (61st overall) in 2020 NFL draft to Titans
Cyril Grayson '12 – Current member of the Tampa Bay Buccaneers football team and Super Bowl Champion.  
 Eddie Jemison – Actor, director, best known for roles in the Ocean's Trilogy and the HBO series Hung
 Omar Khan – Vice President of Football & Business Administration (Pittsburgh Steelers)
 Troy Kropog '04 – Offensive lineman (New York Giants, (Tennessee Titans, Minnesota Vikings)
 Brian Palermo – Character actor, science communicator, and comedian
 Steve Scalise '83 – U.S. Representative from Louisiana; former member of the Louisiana House of Representatives and the Louisiana State Senate
 Craig Steltz '04 – LSU 2007 All American, 2007 LSU Football Captain.  Chicago Bears safety
 Amy Coney Barrett '90 (St. Mary's Dominican High School)- Associate Justice of the Supreme Court of the United States Member of Archbishop Rummel Genesian Players.

References

External links
 

Private middle schools in Louisiana
Private high schools in Louisiana
Catholic secondary schools in Louisiana
Catholic secondary schools in New Orleans
Lasallian schools in the United States
Middle schools in New Orleans
Schools in Jefferson Parish, Louisiana
Boys' schools in the United States
Educational institutions established in 1962
1962 establishments in Louisiana